Earthquakes in Russia have occasionally been damaging and deadly.

Map

Some of the largest Russian earthquakes since the latter half of the 20th century are the 1958/1963 and 2006/2007 earthquakes in the Kuril Islands near Japan, as well as the 1952/1959 earthquakes in the Kamchatka Peninsula,  all of which were ≥ 8.0 M. See also the Kuril–Kamchatka Trench.

Earthquakes

See also
Geology of Russia
Kamchatka earthquakes
List of tectonic plate interactions
List of volcanoes in Russia

References

Russia
earthquakes
 
earthquakes
 
Earthquakes